Stevenage may refer to:

Stevenage, a town and district in Hertfordshire, UK.
Stevenage (UK Parliament constituency)
Stevenage F.C., Stevenage's football club
Stevenage railway station, the station which serves Stevenage